Provincial road N705 (N705) is a road connecting N706 between Almere and Lelystad with N301 near Zeewolde.

External links

705
705